The 1994 PGA Tour season was played from January 6 to October 30. The season consisted of 44 official money events. Nick Price won the most tournaments, six, and there were 10 first-time winners. The tournament results, leaders, and award winners are listed below.

After twenty years as commissioner of the PGA Tour, Deane Beman stepped down in June and was succeeded by Tim Finchem. Beman, a former tour player, became the tour's second commissioner in 1974 at age 35, following Joseph Dey.

As of 2018, the 1994 seasons remains the only year that an American golfer did not win one of the four majors when all were held.

Schedule 
The following table lists official events during the 1994 season.

Unofficial events
The following events were sanctioned by the PGA Tour, but did not carry official money, nor were wins official.

Money leaders
The money list was based on prize money won during the season, calculated in U.S. dollars.

Awards

Notes

References

External links
PGA Tour official site

PGA Tour seasons
PGA Tour